Kenneth William Cockfield (8 October 1928 – 23 April 2001) was an Australian rules footballer who played with St Kilda in the Victorian Football League (VFL).

Notes

External links 

1928 births
Australian rules footballers from Victoria (Australia)
St Kilda Football Club players
2001 deaths